William Forester may refer to:

 Sir William Forester (1655–1718), MP for Wenlock 1679–85 and 1689–15
 William Forester (1690–1758), MP for Wenlock 1715–22, 1734–41 and 1754–58
 William A. Forester (1915–1988), American actor, primarily on TV (including Little House on the Prairie, 77 Sunset Strip, The Untouchables)